E. erecta may refer to:
 Ehrharta erecta, the panic veldtgrass, a grass species native to Southern Africa and Yemen
 Eclipta erecta, a synonym for Eclipta alba

See also
 Erecta